Pauline Kim, a specialist in employment law, is the Charles Nagel Chair of Constitutional Law and Political Science at Washington University in St. Louis and the Co-Director of its Center for Empirical Research in the Law.

Biography 
Kim earned an A.B., summa cum laude, in social justice from Harvard and Radcliffe Colleges in 1984. From 1984 to 1985, Kim attended New College, Oxford University, as a Henry Fellow (Studies in jurisprudence, political and moral philosophy). In 1988, Kim graduated with J.D., magna cum laude, from Harvard Law School.

Kim served as a Clerk for   Cecil F. Poole on the United States Court of Appeals for the Ninth Circuit (1988-1989). Then, she became a Staff Attorney at the Employment Law Center of the Legal Aid Society of San Francisco (1990-1994).   In 1994, she joined the faculty of Washington University   School of Law as   Associate Professor. She was the first recipient of the law school's John S. Lehmann Research Professorship in 2007-2008 and was the  school's Associate Dean for Research and Faculty Development in 2008-2010, and   co-founded its Workshop on Empirical Research in the Law.

Awards and honors 
 David M. Becker Professor of the Year, 2016
International Association of Privacy Professionals Paper Award for "Data-Driven Discrimination at Work," presented at Privacy Law Scholars' Conference, 2016

Selected publications 
 Work Law: Cases and Materials (3d ed.), with Marion Crain & Michael Selmi, Matthew Bender & Co./LexisNexis Group (2015).

References

External links 
 Washington University School of Law Faculty Profile
 The Center for Empirical Research in the Law 
 Equal Employment Opportutniy Commission Litigation Project

Harvard Law School alumni
Radcliffe College alumni
Year of birth missing (living people)
Living people
American legal scholars
Alumni of New College, Oxford
Washington University in St. Louis faculty